The Dublin St Stephen's Green by-election, 1888 was a parliamentary by-election held for the United Kingdom House of Commons constituency of Dublin St Stephen's Green on 12 May 1888. It arose as a result of the death of the sitting member, Edmund Dwyer Gray, of the Irish Parliamentary Party. In April, the Times reported that Wilfrid Blunt would be the Irish Parliamentary Party candidate. However, in a bid to appeal to Ulster Presbyterians, the Irish Party leader Charles Stewart Parnell nominated Thomas Alexander Dickson, a Presbyterian who had been Liberal MP for Dungannon and County Tyrone, as candidate. The Conservatives nominated Robert Sexton, a member of Dublin Corporation and Chairman of the South Dublin Union Poor Law Board. Sexton was supported also by the Liberal Unionists. His campaign was interrupted unexpectedly by the death of his wife.

Sexton received 2,932 votes, an increase on the Unionist performance in the preceding general election. Dickson received 4,819 votes, down slightly from Gray's general election result, and was declared elected. At the next general election, in 1892, he contested the seat of South Tyrone as a Liberal, losing to a Liberal Unionist. It was reported that a boy of 14, whose name was on the register, had voted for Dickson.

Result

Previous result

References

1888 elections in the United Kingdom
By-elections to the Parliament of the United Kingdom in Dublin (city) constituencies
May 1888 events
1888 elections in Ireland